Matthew Hilton may refer to:

 Matthew Hilton (historian), British social historian
 Matthew Hilton (designer) (born 1957), British furniture designer
 Matthew Hilton (boxer) (born 1965), Canadian light-middleweight boxer